The 2015–16 Rugby-Bundesliga is the 45th edition of this competition and the 96th edition of the German rugby union championship. In the Rugby-Bundesliga, sixteen teams play in two regional divisions, followed by play-offs consisting of the top two teams in each division. The regular season started on 29 August 2015 and finished on 24 April 2016, followed by the semi-finals and the championship final, the latter held on 7 May 2016, with the DRV-Pokal and the promotion-relegation play-off continuing until June 2016. The season was interrupted by a winter break from early November to early March.

The defending champions were Heidelberger RK who defeated TV Pforzheim 53–27 in the 2015 final to take out its twelfth championship and sixth in a row. The club thereby also equaled a championship record, becoming the second club after TSV Victoria Linden to win six consecutive titles. The 2016 championship was won by TV Pforzheim, defeating Heidelberger RK 41–36 in the final. For Pforzheim it was the first national rugby union championship, an achievement seen as a surprise given the dominance of Heidelberg, having defeated Pforzheim in three previous finals. 

The modus and size of the league had been altered from the 2014–15 season, with the number of clubs reduced from, nominally, 24 to 16.

Overview

The Rugby-Bundesliga, which had been playing with 21 clubs in 2014–15, three less than the nominal strength of 24, was reduced to 16 clubs for 2015–16. The previous season, the league played a first round of four regional groups, followed by a second round with two regional groups of eight, and play-offs consisting of twelve teams, Instead, the 2015–16 season saw a reduction to just two regional groups of eight teams each.

In the 2015–16 Bundesliga each team plays the other seven in their division twice, home and away, during the regular season. No games will be played between clubs from opposite divisions during this phase. The regular season will be followed by play-offs in which the winner of the south-west division plays the runners-up of the north-east and the winner of the north-east the runners-up of the south-west division. The two semi-final winners then contest the German championship final, scheduled for 21 May 2016.

The remaining twelve teams enter the DRV-Pokal, whereby the clubs placed third and fourth receive a bye for the first round. The last placed team in each division will be automatically relegated to the 2. Rugby-Bundesliga. The second-last team in each division has to play the 2. Bundesliga semi-final losers for a place in the 2016–17 Rugby-Bundesliga.

Compare to the 2014–15  season no team was promoted to the Bundesliga but five teams relegated from the league, TSV Victoria Linden, SG Siemensstadt/Grizzlies, Berliner SV 92 Rugby, RC Aachen and Heidelberger TV.

Bundesliga tables

North-East
The final division table :

 Hamburger RC deducted two points for breach of licensing regulations.

South-West
The final division table:

 TV Pforzheim deducted two points for breach of licensing regulations.

Key

Play-off stage

Championship
The top two teams in each division qualified for the play-offs with the semi finals held on 30 April and the final on 7 May 2016:

DRV-Pokal
The remaining twelve Bundesliga clubs not qualified for the championship play-off entered the DRV-Pokal, the premier rugby union cup competition in Germany. The teams placed third and fourth received a bye for the first round:

The first round will see the teams placed fifth to eighth drawn against each other:

For the quarter finals teams were not seeded, with the clubs placed third and fourth entering the competition. The quarter finals are scheduled for 4 and 5 June, the semi finals for 11 and 12 June and the final for 25 or 26 June:

Promotion round
The winners and runners-up of the four 2. Bundesliga divisions entered the promotion play-off to determine the two teams promoted directly and the two entering the play-off with Bundesliga seventh placed clubs. The promotion play-off will be conducted in two regional groups with the northern and eastern division clubs in one and the southern and western division ones in the other:

North-East

South-West

Promotion-Relegation round
The runners-up of the two regional promotion play-off were scheduled to compete with the seventh-placed Bundesliga teams for two more spots in the Bundesliga:

 Because the game between RFC München and RC Luxembourg had to be rescheduled because of an international played by the Luxembourg national team the final decider between München and Heusenstamm was delayed. Rescheduled a number of times it was eventually cancelled by München, Heusenstamm thereby retaining their Bundesliga place.

References

External links 
 rugbyweb.de - Rugby-Bundesliga table & results 
 Totalrugby.de - Bundesliga table & results 
 Rugby-Bundesliga at scoresway.com

2015–16
2015–16 in German rugby union
Germany